Luru Mayu (Quechua luru pip, mayu river, "pip river", Hispanicized spellings Loro Mayu, Loromayu) is a  mountain in Bolivia. It is located in the Potosí Department, Sud Lípez Province, San Pablo de Lípez Municipality. It lies in the Eduardo Avaroa Andean Fauna National Reserve, southeast of a lake named Luru Mayu.

References 

Mountains of Potosí Department